Ramratan Janorkar was a dalit leader and former mayor of Nagpur city.

Janorkar was born in bhangi (sweeper) caste.  He later dedicated his life to the Ambedkar movement and converted to Buddhism.

He was a member of Republican Party of India and elected as mayor of Nagpur in 1976.  He served as mayor in 1976–77.

References

Bibliography

Nagpur
Dalit leaders
Republican Party of India politicians
Mayors of Nagpur
Indian Buddhists
20th-century Buddhists
21st-century Buddhists
Social workers from Maharashtra
Converts to Buddhism from Hinduism
Dalit activists
Activists from Maharashtra
20th-century Indian politicians
21st-century Indian politicians
Politicians from Nagpur
Year of birth missing
Possibly living people